Peter Francis Dunne  (born 17 March 1954) is a retired New Zealand politician who was the Member of Parliament (MP) for Ōhāriu. He held the seat and its predecessors from 1984 to 2017—representing the Labour Party in Parliament from 1984 to 1994, and a succession of minor centrist parties from 1994. He was the Leader of Future New Zealand from 1994 to 1995, United New Zealand from 1996 to 2000, and United Future from 2000 to 2017.

He served as a Cabinet minister while in the Labour Party and has since done so in governments dominated by the centre-right National Party as well as by the Labour Party. From 2005 to 2008 he held the posts of Minister of Revenue and Associate Minister of Health as a minister outside of Cabinet with the Labour-led government. After Labour suffered an election defeat in 2008 to the National Party, United Future was reduced to having Dunne as its sole MP. However, in a deal between United Future and National, Dunne retained his two portfolios outside Cabinet. On 7 June 2013 he resigned his warrant as a minister due to a purported leak from his office. He effectively was an independent MP between 25 June 2013 and 13 August 2013 when United Future was temporarily deregistered. On 28 January 2014 Dunne was reinstated as a minister holding the Internal Affairs, Associate Health, and Associate Conservation portfolios.

On 21 August 2017, Dunne announced that he would retire from politics and pulled out of campaigning for re-election at the 2017 New Zealand general election. United Future lost its sole seat in Parliament and attained only 0.1% of the party vote. He is retired as an active politician, and is now a political commentator.

Early life and family
Dunne was born in Christchurch on 17 March 1954, the son of Ralph and Joan Dunne. He attended St Bede's College and gained an MA in political science from Canterbury University before studying business administration at Massey University.

In 1976, he married high school chemistry teacher Jennifer Mackrell, and they have two sons. His brother, John Dunne, is a radio broadcaster. A grandfather, Frank Smyth, played for the All Blacks. He worked for the Department of Trade and Industry from 1977 to 1978 and then for the Alcoholic Liquor Advisory Council until 1984. He served as Deputy Chief Executive of the council from 1980 to 1984.

Member of Parliament

Labour MP
In the 1984 election, Dunne successfully stood for Parliament as a candidate of the Labour Party, winning the seat of Ohariu, defeating sitting National MP Hugh Templeton. Bob Jones, leader of the New Zealand Party (not to be confused with New Zealand First), also stood in the seat, splitting the former National vote and enabling the Labour victory in the seat. Dunne retained the seat in the 1987 election, after which he became a Parliamentary Undersecretary. In 1990, he became Minister of Regional Development, Associate Minister for the Environment, and Associate Minister of Justice. He won his seat again in the 1990 election, but the Labour Party suffered defeat, and Dunne thus lost his ministerial posts. In November 1990 he was appointed as Labour's spokesperson for Revenue, Regional Development and the Environment by Labour leader Mike Moore.

In the 1993 election, Dunne won the seat of Onslow, which covered much the same area as his former Ohariu seat. He found himself, however, increasingly at odds with the majority of the Labour PartyDunne tended to support Labour's right-leaning faction rather than the party's more unionist wing. With the departure of leading right-wingers like Roger Douglas, Richard Prebble and David Caygill he found himself isolated. In October 1994 Dunne resigned from the Labour Party, becoming an independent MP. Soon after he rebuffed an approach by National MP Christine Fletcher to join the National Party. A short time later, he established the Future New Zealand party (not to be confused with a later party of the same name).

United New Zealand party

In 1995, a group of MPs from both Labour and National decided to band together and form a new centrist party. Dunne, who had already quit his party in a similar way, decided to join the larger group. Together, the defectors and Dunne established the United New Zealand party, with a total of seven MPs, led by Clive Matthewson. United eventually established a coalition with the National Party, with the deal seeing Dunne return to Cabinet as Minister of Internal Affairs and Revenue.

United New Zealand hoped to take advantage of the new mixed-member proportional (MMP) system, which took effect for the 1996 election. However, that election saw United New Zealand almost completely wiped out. Dunne, by virtue of his personal support, won the newly formed seat of Ohariu-Belmont, but all other United MPs suffered defeat. As the sole surviving United member in the House, Dunne became the party's leader. Towards the end of the parliamentary term, Dunne became part of a varied assortment of minor parties and independents who kept the National Party government in office after its coalition with New Zealand First collapsed in August 1998. Dunne retained his seat in the 1999 election. In this contest, the National Party put up no candidate in his electorate.

United Future New Zealand party
In 2000, Dunne's United merged with the Future New Zealand party (not to be confused with Dunne's own earlier party of the same name). Dunne remained leader of the new group, called United Future New Zealand. In the 2002 election, Dunne retained his seat despite challenges from both major parties. Mostly as a result of a strong performance by Dunne in a televised political debate, United Future surged unexpectedly in support, winning 6.69% of the nationwide party vote. In Parliament, United Future came to an agreement to support the governing Labour Party, although the two parties did not enter into a formal coalition arrangement. Dunne remained United Future's leader.

United Future New Zealand working with Outdoor Recreation
United Future, like other minor political parties working in coalition, suffered in the polls. The United Future entered an agreement to work formally with the Outdoor Recreation Party, a registered political party formed to represent the views of hunters, fishers, trampers and recreational users of the marine and natural environment.

Dunne retained his seat in the 2005 general election but his party's proportion of the nationwide vote diminished considerably, with a corresponding loss of seats in Parliament.

Fifth Labour Government
On 17 October 2005 Dunne gave his support to a Labour-led Government, along with Winston Peters' New Zealand First Party and Jim Anderton's Progressive Party. Dunne's decision to support a Labour-led Government disappointed some. During the election campaign Dunne and National Party leader Don Brash publicly sat outside an Epsom café over a cup of tea as a demonstration to the electorate that Dunne could co-operate with National. This demonstration saw the majority of National supporters in Ohariu-Belmont combine with United Future and other Dunne supporters to return Dunne with a comfortable majority. National won the party vote in his seat by 3.57% over Labour. Dunne's party received 5.55%, while the Green Party, which Dunne had criticised heavily in the campaign, received 5.84%.

Don Brash expressed a lack of amusement with Dunne's decision to support a Labour-led coalition government. Brash expressed astonishment at Dunne accepting the ministerial portfolio of Revenue while remaining outside Cabinet. Asked if he considered Dunne guilty of dirty dealing, Brash said he would not use those words.  Representatives of business, however, welcomed the appointment.

After the 2005 New Zealand general election, United Future retained only two list Members of Parliament, Judy Turner and Gordon Copeland. Copeland left the party in May 2007 to re-form the Future New Zealand Party, after opposing Dunne over Sue Bradford's private members bill against parental corporal punishment of children. After Copeland's departure, Judy Turner remained the only United Future List MP in Parliament. Dunne supported Bradford's Child Discipline Act.

Fifth National Government

United Future's share of the party vote declined further in the 2008 election, to less than one percent. However, Dunne retained his electorate seat. The National Party won most seats overall and formed a minority government with support from Dunne, the Māori Party and Act New Zealand. Dunne retained his positions of Minister of Revenue and Associate Minister of Health. However, like ministers from the other support parties, he remained outside Cabinet.

Between December 2008 and August 2009, Dunne served as the chairman of the Emissions Trading Scheme Review Committee. Dunne described the committee's report, which consisted of four minority reports, as a "middle road" through "complex and contentious" material.

In 2010, as Minister of Revenue, Dunne introduced the Taxation (Income-sharing Tax Credit) Bill to Parliament in September 2010, to give effect to United Future's policy of allowing couples raising dependent children up to the age of 18 years to share their incomes for tax purposes. The Bill was referred to a select committee and was reported back to Parliament in March 2011, but never had a second reading. In April 2011, the government announced the establishment of a statutory Game Animal Council, another United Future initiative agreed to as part of the 2008 confidence and supply agreement.

Dunne has long argued for reform of the superannuation system, proposing a flexible system where people could retire earlier and receive less, or later and receive more.

During the fifth National government's second term (2011–14), Dunne was reappointed Minister of Revenue and Associate Minister of Health, and gained an additional appointment as Associate Minister of Conservation. With the Government majority reduced, Dunne held the balance of power for more than ten pieces of legislation in that term, including the Government's asset-sales plan.

As Associate Minister of Health, Dunne had responsibility for drugs, mental health and suicide prevention. He was responsible for the Psychoactive Substances Act 2013, which established a regulated market for psychoactive substances, and New Zealand's National Drug Policy released in 2015. In 2015–17 he made moves to make cannabis-based medicines more available to New Zealanders.

As Minister of Internal Affairs between 2014 and 2017 Dunne extended the term of the New Zealand passport from 5 years to 10 years and led the development of an integrated national fire and emergency service, Fire and Emergency New Zealand, to replace the New Zealand Fire Service and the separate Rural Fire Service. He also oversaw the He Tohu project which saw three of New Zealand's most precious constitutional documents – the 1835 Declaration of Independence, the 1840 Treaty of Waitangi, and the 1893 Women's Suffrage petition – rehoused in a purpose-built facility at the National Library.

Resignation and reinstatement 
In mid-2013 Dunne refused to hand over all 86 emails between himself and Fairfax journalist Andrea Vance relating to the inquiry into the leaking of Rebecca Kitteridge's GCSB report following its illegal spying on Kim Dotcom. Prime Minister John Key told Dunne that if he would not co-operate with the inquiry he would have to resign his ministerial positions – which he did on 7 June. However, in December 2013 Parliament's powerful Privileges Committee found that Dunne was entirely within his rights to decline the Henry Inquiry access to his emails. It further described the actions of the Henry Inquiry as "unacceptable", "mystifying" and "unprecedented". The committee found "failure at many levels", particularly as to why the Speaker of the House was not consulted, or at least informed, about the requests and information releases. In December 2014 the Chief Ombudsman ruled that the emails did not contain official information and were therefore not required to be released.

On 28 January 2014, Dunne was reinstated to the Executive as Minister of Internal Affairs, Associate Minister of Health, and Associate Minister of Conservation. He retained his portfolios on 29 September 2014, after the 2014 general election, in the third term of the National Party-led government.

Party registration status 
On 31 May 2013 the New Zealand Electoral Commission de-registered the United Future Party at their request, following concerns the party no longer had the requisite 500 members. This meant Dunne was no longer the leader of a political party and was denied more than $180,000 in funding he had previously been allocated as a party leader. The Electoral Commission re-registered United Future as a political party on 13 August 2013. The Speaker of the House, David Carter, restored Dunne's position as leader of a recognised Parliamentary party and re-allocated party funding in late August 2013.

Honours and awards
In 1990, Dunne was awarded the New Zealand 1990 Commemoration Medal. In the 2018 New Year Honours, he was appointed a Companion of the New Zealand Order of Merit, for services as a member of Parliament.

Political philosophy

Dunne supported the decriminalisation of homosexuality when it became an issue in the mid-1980s, and has consistently favoured more liberal drinking laws. In a 2008 interview, he suggested it may be time to review New Zealand's abortion laws and leave the decision to a woman and her doctor, based on informed consent.

From 2007, Dunne rebranded United Future as a centrist party, based on promoting strong families and vibrant communities. He wanted United Future to become New Zealand's version of Britain's Liberal Democrats. Dunne has summarised his political views in two books, Home is Where My Heart Is (2002) and In the Centre of Things (2005).

Republicanism
Dunne supports a New Zealand republic, and holding an early referendum on the future of New Zealand's head of state has become part of United Future's policy programme. In 2004 he chaired the Constitutional Arrangements Committee. Dunne also supports the declaration of a New Zealand Day and has sponsored a member's bill on the issue.

Political publications

References

External links

Profile on New Zealand Parliament website

|-

|-

|-

|-

|-

|-

|-

|-

1954 births
Living people
New Zealand people of Irish descent
Massey University alumni
New Zealand Labour Party MPs
New Zealand MPs for Wellington electorates
Leaders of political parties in New Zealand
Members of the New Zealand House of Representatives
New Zealand republicans
United Future MPs
United New Zealand MPs
University of Canterbury alumni
People educated at St Bede's College, Christchurch
Government ministers of New Zealand
Members of the Cabinet of New Zealand
21st-century New Zealand politicians
Companions of the New Zealand Order of Merit